Major Alexander Malins Lafone, VC (19 August 1870 – 27 October 1917) was an English British Army officer and a recipient of the Victoria Cross, the highest and most prestigious award for gallantry in the face of the enemy that can be awarded to British and Commonwealth forces.

Background
Lafone was educated at Dulwich College. He was commissioned a second lieutenant in the Middlesex Yeomanry (Duke of Cambridge's Hussars) on 14 August 1901, fought in the Second Boer War in various regiments, and was invalided in 1901. He was promoted to lieutenant on 27 September 1902. He then stayed on in Africa working for the Colonial Office as an Assistant Resident in Northern Nigeria. Recurrent attacks of fever forced him back to England where he worked and kept up his connections with the Army.

Victoria Cross

His citation from the London Gazette reads:

References

External links

Major Alexander Malius Lafone at the Australian Light Horse Studies Centre
Liverpool VCs (James Murphy, Pen and Sword Books, 2008)
CWGC entry

1870 births
1917 deaths
British Army personnel of the Second Boer War
British Army personnel of World War I
British Army recipients of the Victoria Cross
British military personnel killed in World War I
British World War I recipients of the Victoria Cross
Imperial Yeomanry officers
Middlesex Yeomanry officers
people educated at Dulwich College
Victoria Cross awardees from Liverpool